Great West Media Limited Partnership is a Canadian publisher of weekly newspapers in the province of Alberta. It is headquartered in St. Albert, Alberta.

The company is jointly owned by Glacier Media, a Vancouver-based publisher, and the local family business Jamison Newspapers, which operates Great West's properties.

History 
Great West was founded in 1995 as a partnership between Southam Inc. and the Jamison family, which had owned the St. Albert Gazette since 1966 (the newspaper itself had been founded in 1961). The Jamisons had run the paper as a family business but prided themselves on professional journalism; the Gazette staff produced a daily newspaper for the 1978 Commonwealth Games in Edmonton.

The Gazette had first partnered with Southam in 1988, when the Jamisons began printing suburban editions of Neighbours, a publication of the Southam-owned Edmonton Journal, as well as some colour comics and television inserts for the Journal and Calgary Herald.

Over the next 15 years, Great West grew its holdings to 20 weekly newspapers across the province. In 1997, Southam was purchased by Hollinger Inc. In 2005, Jamison Newspapers bought out its partner but sold a 50% stake in Great West to Glacier Media.  The company built a $25 million office and printing plant in Campbell Business Park. In August, 2012, the company announced that it struck a deal with Postmedia to print the Edmonton Journal. The Journal will begin printing at Great West's facility in the late spring of 2013.

Great West swapped newspapers with Black Press in 2010, gaining the Rocky Mountain Outlook in Canmore, Alberta, and unloading the Red Deer Express, a weekly that competed with Black's daily Red Deer Advocate. The swap was part of a larger deal that saw Glacier sell many of its British Columbia newspapers to Black.

Glacier continued to operate a competing award-winning weekly in St. Albert, the Saint City News, until 2010, when the paper was sold to Great West. Great West closed the Saint City News in 2011, citing a decline in advertising revenue.

Properties 
Great West newspapers, all of which are weeklies based in Alberta, are:

 Airdrie City View
 Alberta Prime Times
 Cochrane Eagle
 Lakeland This Week
 Okotoks Western Wheel
 Rocky Mountain Outlook
 Rocky View Weekly
 St. Albert Gazette
 The Albertan
 Town and Country This Week

Great West Media also owns 51 Degrees North magazine, a digital and print publication that is dedicated to finding and telling the stories of the beings of the Bow Valley.

The company also owns several regional publications and an interest in Glacier Media's agricultural publications.

See also
List of newspapers in Canada

References

External links 
 Great West Newspapers

Glacier Media
Newspaper companies of Canada
Companies based in Alberta
St. Albert, Alberta